Colayer GmbH is a software product company, headquartered in Zurich, Switzerland, founded in 2000 by Markus Hegi, the current CEO. Colayer GmbH also has a subsidiary, Colayer Web Conversations Private Limited located in Pune, India. Colayer offers a context-driven platform to build social interactive Web 2.0 environments and Virtual workplaces for enterprises.

History

The concepts which eventually became Colayer, were worked out by founder, Markus Hegi, in 1999 and a small working prototype was developed on his laptop.

2000-2003: Markus Hegi founded Metalayer AG, to work further on his concepts. The development of these concepts started as a collaboration tool prototype, referred to as "The metalayer Comty Hub". The exploration of suitable technologies were taken out for further scalability of the platform.
2004-2006: In 2004, Colayer GmbH was established by the same founder who started Metalayer. The management team decided to develop the platform to C++ architecture from the ASP.NET model. The focus was to build the core of the Colayer, a Web 2.0 platform for the social web.
2009: Colayer offers a platform to build interactive social Web 2.0 environments. Colayer aims to be the environment for creating social networking websites and applications. In 2009, the similarities of Colayer and Google Wave were discussed.

Use in business
Colayer has integrated  web technologies 2.0, to come up with the contextualized collaborative software—enabling businesses from different geographical locations to communicate. Colayer (or Collaboration layer) is also the name of the product, a social web software that can be used to create a virtual organisation. It has content management system, virtual conferencing (online meetings, email and SMS notification), reporting and statistical analysis.

References

External links
 Colayer website

Swiss companies established in 2000
Companies based in Zürich
Web development software
Software companies established in 2000